Aberaman railway station was the name given to two railway stations on the Taff Vale Railway near Aberdare in the Welsh preserved county of Mid Glamorgan. The first station, opened by the Aberdare Railway, only lasted ten years and was closed under Taff Vale ownership. Then the  name of the adjacent Treaman was changed to Aberaman.

History

The second station was incorporated, as part of the Taff Vale Railway, into the Great Western Railway during the Grouping of 1923. The line then passed on to the Western Region of British Railways on nationalisation in 1948. The station was closed by the British Railways Board.

References

Sources

External links
 Aberaman station on navigable 1946 O. S. map

Former Taff Vale Railway stations
Disused railway stations in Rhondda Cynon Taf
Beeching closures in Wales
Railway stations in Great Britain opened in 1846
Railway stations in Great Britain closed in 1856
Railway stations in Great Britain closed in 1964
1846 establishments in Wales